Constantin Marie Le Paige (9 March 1852 – 26 January 1929) was a Belgian mathematician.

Born in Liège, Belgium, Le Paige began studying mathematics in 1869 at the University of Liège. After studying analysis under Professor Eugène Charles Catalan, Le Paige became a professor at the Université de Liège in 1882. 

While interested in astronomy and the history of mathematics, Le Paige mainly worked on the theory of algebraic form, especially algebraic curves and surfaces and more particularly for his work on the construction of cubic surfaces. Le Paige remained at the university until his retirement in 1922.

External links

Le Paige biography at www-groups.dcs.st-and.ac.uk

1852 births
1929 deaths
19th-century Belgian mathematicians
20th-century Belgian mathematicians
20th-century Belgian astronomers
University of Liège alumni
Scientists from Liège
Academic staff of the University of Liège